Lyonel Trouillot (born 31 December 1956, in Port-au-Prince, Haiti) is a novelist and poet in French and Haitian Creole, a journalist and a professor of French and Creole literature in Port-au-Prince.

Early life
Lyonel Trouillot was born in a family of lawyers. The writer Évelyne Trouillot and the writer and educator Jocelyne Trouillot are his sisters. Following his parents' divorce in the late 1960s, he went to the United States with his mother. He returned to Haiti at age 19, in 1975.

Between 1980 and 1982, political repression forced Trouillot to emigrate to Miami.

He studied at law, but he switched to literature early in his career.

Career
Trouillot has contributed to different newspapers and magazines in Haiti. He has published poetry, and also writes song lyrics for such musical artists as Tambou Libète and Manno Charlemagne.

Trouillot is a co-editor of the journal Cahiers du Vendredi.

Along with his sister Evelyne Trouillot and her daughter Nadève Ménard, he founded a writer's organisation named Pré-Texte.

In 2014 he wrote together with Raoul Peck and Pascal Bonitzer the script for Peck's feature film Murder in Pacot.

Politics
Trouillot is known for his political stances, and for his resistance to the Haitian Duvalierist dictatorship. He was also part of the Collective Non of intellectuals and artists that helped to build momentum for the U.S. and paramilitary backed ouster of the democratically elected president Jean-Bertrand Aristide. He was a member of the unelected transitional government following the departure of Aristide, as a cabinet minister of culture.

Select bibliography

Novels 
 Rue des pas perdus, Mémoire, Port-au-Prince, 1996
 Thérèse en mille morceaux, Actes Sud, Arles, 2000
 Les Enfants des héros, Actes Sud, Arles, 2002
 Bicentenaire, Actes Sud, Arles, 2004
 L'Amour avant que j'oublie, Actes Sud, Arles, 2007
 Yanvalou pour Charlie, Actes Sud, Arles, 2009
 dt. Yanvalou für Charlie, 2016, Traduction Barbara Heber-Schärer, Claudia Steinitz, Liebeskind Verlagsbuchhandlung, 
 La Belle Amour humaine, Actes Sud, Arles, 2011
 Le Doux Parfum des temps à venir, Actes Sud, Arles, 2013
 Parabole du failli, Actes Sud, Arles, 2013

Poetry
 Éloge de la contemplation, Riveneuve, Paris, 2009.

Non-fiction
 Haïti le dur devoir d'exister, with Amélie Baron, Mémoire d'Encrier, Montréal, 2010.
 Objectif : l'autre, André Versaille, Brussels, 2012.

Awards and recognition
Trouillot was made a Chevalier des Arts et des Lettres in 2010.

In 2011, he was awarded the Prix Wepler for his novel Yanvalou pour Charlie. For La Belle Amour humane, he was awarded the Grand Prix du Roman Métis (2011), the Geneva Book Fair Literary Prize (2012), and the Gitanjali Literary Prize (2012).

In 2013, he was awarded the Prix Carbet de la Caraïbe et du Tout-Monde for his work, Parabole du failli.

References

1956 births
Living people
Haitian male novelists
Haitian male poets
Haitian writers in French
Haitian Creole-language writers
International Writing Program alumni
20th-century Haitian novelists
20th-century Haitian poets
21st-century Haitian novelists
21st-century Haitian poets
Prix Louis Guilloux winners
20th-century male writers
21st-century male writers
Lyonel